SoftEther Corporation is a Japanese software company. It was founded as an industry-academia-government venture in April 2004 by University of Tsukuba students, with the goal to develop the software of the same name, SoftEther VPN. The name indicated that a software emulates an Ethernet.

Related software

SoftEther
The VPN software called SoftEther (SoftEther 1.0) was written by Daiyu Nobori, who became the Representative Director and Chairman of the new company. In 2003, the software's development was adopted as one of the projects of the Exploratory Youth program, sponsored by Information Technology Promotion Agency, Japan. "In addition to being highly evaluated by the project manager, there were 1 million downloads in three months after making it available at the website."

The first SoftEther sales version was released in August 2004 called SoftEther CA, by Mitsubishi Materials Corporation, Japan.

PacketiX VPN
The second version of the software, released in December 2005, the name of the software was changed to PacketiX VPN 2.0 from SoftEther 2.0. In 2006, PacketiX VPN 2.0 won the "Software of the Year" award from the Information-Technology Promotion Agency.

In 2010 March, PacketiX VPN 3.0 was released by Softether Corporation. Some functions were added to new version (as examples: support IPv6, 802.1Q VLAN, TLS 1.0). This version is compatible with PacketiX VPN 2.0.

In 2013 July, PacketiX VPN 4.0 was released by SoftEther Corporation. In this version, some existent protocols support was added.

UT-VPN

In 2010 June, UT-VPN was released by SoftEther Corporation and University of Tsukuba. UT-VPN is an open source VPN software. UT-VPN has compatible as PacketiX VPN products of SoftEther Corporation.

UT-VPN developed based on PacketiX VPN 3.0, but some functions was deleted. For example, the RADIUS client is supported by PacketiX VPN Server, but it is not supported by UT-VPN Server.

SoftEther VPN
In 2013 July, SoftEther VPN was released by SoftEther VPN Project with SoftEther Corporation and University of Tsukuba.

SoftEther VPN 1.0 developed based on PacketiX VPN 4.0. Compatibility and the restrictions of functions follow UT-VPN. It is scheduled to release source codes with the GNU General Public License (GPL) in 2013.

On January 4, 2014, SoftEther VPN announced that the source code of SoftEther VPN was released as open-source software under the GPLv2 license. SoftEther VPN is the underlying VPN engine of VPN Gate.

External links 
SoftEther Corporation
  (Japanese)
  (Chinese)

External Project (with University of Tsukuba)
 UT-VPN Open Source Project (Japanese)
 SoftEther VPN Project (English)
 VPN Gate Academic Experiment Project (English)

See also
 SoftEther VPN
 UT-VPN

References

Virtual private networks
Companies established in 2004
Networking companies
Software companies of Japan
Companies based in Ibaraki Prefecture